Joseph Antony Bernays (born 1983) is an English singer, drummer and actor who works under the pseudonyms Joe van Moyland and Joe Lean. He was frontman in the band Joe Lean and the Jing Jang Jong and previously drummed for The Pipettes. As an actor, he was best known for his role as Thomas Tallis on The Tudors.

Acting career
Bernays appeared in a number of television shows, most notably in The Tudors, where he played composer Thomas Tallis. He also appeared in Peep Show as Sophie's brother Jamie, Nathan Barley as Mudd, and three episodes of the Channel 4 drama Fresh Meat as well as minor roles in Waking The Dead, Simon Schama's Power of Art and Fortysomething. His film appearances included Starter for Ten, Colour Me Kubrick: A True...ish Story and Brothers of the Head. He left acting after 2011, aside from a small role in Star Wars: The Last Jedi in 2017.

Music career
Under the name Joe Lean, Bernays fronted Joe Lean and the Jing Jang Jong, who released their first single in October 2007 and have been tipped for success by the NME and finished seventh in the BBC Sound Of 2008 poll. However they disbanded before ever releasing an album. 
He had previously been drummer for the Pipettes, working under the name Robin of Loxley. His last appearance with the Pipettes was 23 June 2007 on the Pyramid Stage at the Glastonbury Festival. The NME reported that he had written songs for the Sugababes' new album, however in a later interview Van Moyland said that the agreement had fallen through.

Personal life
In the mid-2010s, Bernays decided that he "didn't want to be in front of the camera anymore" and began a career change. In 2020 he moved permanently to Mallorca with his partner, fashion designer Steffy Borras, and their two children, where he opened a bar named Ocho.

Filmography

Television

References

External links
 

English male television actors
English male singers
Living people
1983 births
Musicians from York
Male actors from York
Male drummers
21st-century English male actors
21st-century English singers
The Pipettes members
21st-century drummers
21st-century British male singers